Limoniini is a tribe of limoniid crane flies in the family Limoniidae. There are about 7 genera and more than 1,400 described species in Limoniini.

Genera
These seven genera belong to the tribe Limoniini:
 Antocha Osten Sacken, 1859
 Dicranoptycha Coquillett, 1910
 Elliptera Schiner, 1863
 Helius Lepeltier & Serville, 1828
 Limonia Meigen, 1800
 Orimarga Osten-sacken, 1869
 Thaumastoptera Milk, 1866

References

External links

Limoniidae
Articles created by Qbugbot